Vedat Marathe Veer Daudle Saat is an upcoming Indian Marathi-language period drama film directed by Mahesh Manjrekar and produced by Vaseem Qureshi under the banner of Qureshi Productions. The film stars Pravin Tarde, Hardeek Joshi, Vishal Nikam, Jai Dudhane Utkarsh Shinde and Virat Madke as the seven heroic Marathas, and Akshay Kumar as Shivaji. It is scheduled to be theatrically released at Diwali 2023.

Premise 
Vedat Maratha Veer Daudle Saat is based on a story about seven legendary warriors in the Maratha Empire who attempt to achieve independence (swaraj) in 1674.

Cast 

 Akshay Kumar as Chhatrapati Shivaji Maharaj
 Pravin Tarde as Prataprao Gujar
 Vishal Nikam as Chandraji Kothar
 Virat Madke as Jivaji Patil
 Hardeek Joshi as Malhari Lokhande
 Gauri Ingawale
 Satya Manjrekar as Dattaji Page
 Utkarsha Shinde as Suryaji Dandkar 
 Jay Dudhane as Tulja Jamkar

Production

Development 
Manjrekar planned Vedat Marathe Veer Daudle Saat for 7 years. The film was announced in November 2022 at a launch event in Mumbai, attended by the Chief minister of Maharashtra Eknath Shinde, MNS president Raj Thackeray and Bollywood actor Salman Khan.

Casting 
Akshay Kumar is making his debut in Marathi cinema with this film. Other roles are played by Pravin Tarde, Hardeek Joshi, Vishal Nikam, Utkarsha Shinde, Jay Dudhane, Virat Madke and Satya Manjrekar.

Filming 
Principal photography of the film started in December 2022 in Mumbai. The shooting of the film is going on in Panhala, during the shooting, a 19-year-old youth falls down from 100 feet and gets seriously injured.  He was admitted to the hospital soon after the accident.

Release

Theatrical 
Vedat Marathe Veer Daudle Saat is scheduled to be theatrically released on Diwali 2023. Along with Marathi, the film will also be released in Hindi, Tamil, and Telugu.

Criticism 
Manjrekar has adopted fictitious names instead of real warrior names in film. Suresh Gujar, who is a descendant of Prataprao Gujar, Nesari and Bhosare (a village in Satara district) has opposed the film, saying that "The fact that Manjrekar has distorted history through this film will not be tolerated at all."

Soundtrack 
The music and background score was written by Hitesh Modak.

References

External links 

 
2023 films
Indian historical films
Cultural depictions of Shivaji
Films set in the Maratha Empire
2020s Marathi-language films
Action films based on actual events
Indian historical drama films
2020s historical drama films
Films set in the 1670s